Dublin English refers to the diverse varieties of Hiberno-English spoken in the metropolitan area of Dublin, the capital of the Republic of Ireland. Modern-day Dublin English largely lies on a phonological continuum between two extremes (largely, a broad versus general accent distinction). The more traditional, lower-prestige, working-class, local urban accent on the one end is known by linguist Raymond Hickey as Local Dublin English. On the other end, a more recently developing, higher-prestige, more widely regional (and even supraregional) accent exists, New Dublin English, only first emerging in the late 1980s and 1990s. As of the 21st century, most speakers from Dublin and its suburbs have accent features falling variously along the entire middle as well as the newer ends of the spectrum, which together form what is called Non-Local Dublin English, employed by the middle and upper class. The strict middle of the continuum is called Mainstream Dublin English, spoken by the middle class.

Mainstream Dublin English has become the basis of a standard accent of Ireland that is no longer regionally specific, becoming widespread everywhere except in the north of the country. However, the majority of Dubliners born since the 1980s (led particularly by females) have shifted towards New Dublin English, the most innovative in terms of its accent and the most extreme variety in rejecting features associated with Local Dublin English. New Dublin English may be in the process of overtaking Mainstream Dublin English as the national prestige variety.

Phonology
In the most general terms, all varieties of Dublin English have the following identifying sounds that are often distinct from the rest of Ireland, pronouncing:
 as fronted and/or raised .
 as retracted and/or centralised .

Local Dublin English
Local Dublin English (or Popular Dublin English) refers to a traditional, broad, working-class variety spoken in Dublin. It is the only Irish English variety that in earlier history was non-rhotic; however, it is today weakly rhotic, and it uniquely pronounces:
 as raised: .
 as fronted and raised: .
 as lowered and unrounded: .
 as diphthongal: .
Lack of the foot-strut split, with  used for both sets.
Intervocalic or word-final  as a glottal stop , or even .

Notable lifelong native speakers
Damien Dempsey – "his distinctly Dublin sounds" and "a working class Dublin accent"
Conor McGregor – "his famous Dublin accent"
Becky Lynch

New Dublin English
Evolving as a fashionable outgrowth of mainstream Non-Local Dublin English, New Dublin English (also, advanced Dublin English and, formerly, fashionable Dublin English) is a relatively young variety that originally began in the early 1990s among the "avant-garde" and now those aspiring to a non-local "urban sophistication". New Dublin English itself, first associated with affluent and middle-class inhabitants of southside Dublin, is probably now spoken by a majority of Dubliners born since the 1980s. 

This "new mainstream" accent of Dublin's youth, rejecting traditional working-class Dublin, pronounces:
 may be , with a backer vowel than in other Irish accents, though still relatively fronted.
 as the RP diphthong .

Notable lifelong native speakers

Saoirse Ronan – "the 'Dub' accent in which she speaks"
Andrew Scott – "his soft-as-rain Dublin accent"
Katie McGrath
Samantha Mumba - described as having a "neutral Dublin" accent
Orla Brady
Seana Kerslake
Fionnula Flanagan
Elaine Cassidy
Sarah Bolger
Angeline Ball
Dominique McElligott

Dublin 4 English  
New Dublin English largely evolved out of an even more innovative variety, Dublin 4 English, which originated around the 1970s or 1980s from middle- or higher-class speakers in South Dublin before spreading outwards. Also known as "D4" or "DART speak" because of local associations, or, mockingly, "Dortspeak", this dialect rejected traditional, conservative, and working-class notions of Irishness, with its speakers instead regarding themselves as more trendy and sophisticated. However, particular aspects of the D4 accent became quickly noticed and ridiculed as sounding affected or elitist by the 1990s, causing its defining features to fall out of fashion by the 1990s. Still, it originated certain (less salient) other features that continue to be preserved in New Dublin English today.

References

Notes

Sources
 
 
 

Culture in Dublin (city)
Dialects of English
Languages of the Republic of Ireland
Irish culture